Gonzalo Gabriel Ritacco (born 21 May 1992) is an Argentine footballer who plays as a midfielder for Venezuelan club Deportivo Táchira.

Career

Ritacco started his career with Argentine third tier side Defensores de Belgrano, where he made 8 league appearances and scored 0 goals. In 2014, he signed for Argentino de Merlo in the Argentine fourth tier. In 2018, Ritacco signed for Ecuadorian second-tier club Orense. Before the 2019 season, he signed for Rampla Juniors in the Uruguayan top flight. In 2019, he signed for Ecuadorian second-tier team Manta. Before the 2020 season, Ritacco signed for Guayaquil City in the Ecuadorian top flight.

In 2020, he signed for Ecuadorian second tier outfit 9 de Octubre. Before the second half of 2020–21, he signed for Rodos in Greece. In 2021, Ritacco signed for Ecuadorian side Delfín. Before the 2022 season, he signed for Qizilqum in Uzbekistan. In 2022, he signed for Tajikistani club Istiklol.

References

External links
 Gonzalo Ritacco at playmakerstats.com

1992 births
Living people